A 1979 Australian Drivers' Championship was a CAMS sanctioned national motor racing title for drivers of Australian Formula 1 racing cars. The championship winner was awarded the 1979 CAMS Gold Star. The title, which was the 23rd Australian Drivers' Championship, was won by Johnnie Walker, driving a Lola T332.

Schedule
The championship was contested over a three-round series with one race per round.

Points system
Championship points were awarded on a 9-6-4-3-2-1 basis to the first six placegetters in each race.

Results

Championship name
Sources of the time differ as to the actual name of the championship with both Australian Drivers' Championship and Australian Formula 1 Championship being used. "Australian Drivers' Championship" is used by Confederation of Australian Motor Sport in its historic documentation and that term has been used here.

References

External links
 John Walker & Lola T332 -1979 AGP images (refer page 32), www.austin7clubsa.com.au
 Western Australian Motor Race Results 1979, www.terrywalkersplace.com 

Australian Drivers' Championship
Drivers' Championship
Formula 5000